Religious broadcasting, sometimes referred to as faith-based broadcasts, is the dissemination of television and/or radio content that intentionally has religious ideas, religious experience, or religious practice as its core focus.  In some countries, religious broadcasting developed primarily within the context of public service provision (as in the UK), whilst in others, it has been driven more by religious organisations themselves (as in the United States).  Across Europe and in the US and Canada, religious broadcasting began in the earliest days of radio, usually with the transmission of religious worship, preaching or "talks". Over time, formats evolved to include a broad range of styles and approaches, including radio and television drama, documentary, and chat show formats, as well as more traditional devotional content. Today, many religious organizations record sermons and lectures, and have moved into distributing content on their own web-based IP channels.

Religious broadcasting can be funded commercially or through some sort of public broadcasting-style arrangement (religious broadcasters are often recognized as non-profit organizations). Donations from listeners and viewers, often tax-deductible, are solicited by some broadcasters. In the US, 42 percent of non-commercial radio stations currently have a religious format where on the other hand about 80 percent of the 2,400 Christian radio stations and 100 full-power Christian TV stations throughout the entire United States are considered non-profit.

In some countries, particularly those with an established state religion, broadcasting related to one particular religion only is allowed, or in some cases required. For example, a function of the state-owned Pakistan Broadcasting Corporation is by law "to broadcast such programmes as may promote Islamic ideology, national unity and principles of democracy, freedom equality, tolerance and social justice as enunciated by Islam..." (s. 10(1)(b)).

Broadcasting in both radio and TV has taken on a new look with the development of the internet and mobile devices. Internet radio stations and internet TV stations have been on the rise over the last few years. The main reason for the increase is that the cost to setup and operate is significantly less than traditional radio and TV stations. This is huge for religious organisations as it allows them to put their religious content to a world wide audience at a fraction of the cost.

Radio
(The distinction between radio and television broadcasters is not rigid; broadcasters in both areas may appear in the Radio or Television section in this article.)

Australia
Religious radio stations include
 3ABN Australia Radio
 Melbourne Jewish Radio
 Australia National Hindu Radio (ANHR)

Brazil
Rede Católica de Rádio (Catholic radio network)
Rádio Canção Nova
Rádio Aparecida
Rádio Imaculada Conceição
Rádio Evangelizar
Rádio Novo Tempo (Seventh-day Adventist Church)
Rede Aleluia (Universal Church of the Kingdom of God)
Rádio Deus é Amor (God is Love Pentecostal Church)
Rede Gospel FM (Reborn in Christ Church)
Rede Nossa Rádio (International Grace of God Church)
Rede Feliz FM (Peace and Life Christian Community)
Rede Sara Brasil FM (Heal Our Earth Evangelical Community)

Canada 

 Canadian Islamic Broadcasting Network (CIBN) - Islamic Talk Radio

India
 World Hindu Radio ;World latest Hindu Community Radio Station based in Ayodhya,India
 Asian Hindu Radio; based on Ayodhya and Suva
 Marithus Hindu Voice
 Fiji Hindu Radio
 Angel Radio 
 Jai Ram Community Radio
 Hindustan World Radio
 Malabar Muslim Radio
 Asian Muslim World
 Lord Radio
 Jwiees Radio International
 Vice of Hindu (VOH)
 Vice of Jain (VOJ)
 Vice of Sikh (VOS)
 Vice of Parasi (VOP)
 Vice of Christian (VOC)
 VOH Hindi
 VOH Tamil
 VOH Bangla

Italy
Radio Maria ; International Catholic radio broadcasting, founded by Erba, has branches in 55 countries around the world. Vatican Radio is its sister media.

Netherlands

 Buddhist Broadcasting Foundation
Humanistische Omroep: A small broadcaster dedicated to secular Humanism.
 IKON (Interkerkelijke Omroep Nederland): A small broadcaster representing a diverse set of nine mainstream Christian churches.
 Joodse Omroep The new name of NIKmedia (Nederlands-Israëlitisch Kerkgenootschap): Dutch-Jewish broadcaster.
 NIO (Nederlandse Islamitische Omroep): Small Islamic broadcaster.
 NMO (Nederlandse Moslim Omroep): Small Islamic broadcaster, slightly more progressive than the NIO.
 OHM (Organisatie Hindoe Media): Small Hindu broadcaster.
 RKK (Rooms-Katholiek Kerkgenootschap): Small Roman Catholic broadcaster, actual programming produced by the KRO. Roman Catholic events and services on television are broadcast by the RKK.
 ZvK (Zendtijd voor Kerken): Small broadcaster that broadcasts church services from some smaller Protestant churches.

New Zealand
 Rhema Media encompasses three radio networks; Rhema, Life FM and Star.

Philippines
 Catholic Media Network (Catholicism)
 Cebu Catholic Television Network
 End-Time Mission Broadcasting Service
 FEBC Philippines (Christianity)
 INC Radio 954 (Iglesia ni Cristo)
 Sonshine Radio
 ZOE Broadcasting Network

Poland
 Radio Maryja – A Christian-national Polish educational, guide and religious radio station based in Toruń, belonging to the Lux Veritatis Foundation registered in Warsaw.

Portugal
 Rádio Maria – Catholic radio
 Rádio Canção Nova – Catholic radio

South Korea
 GCN Global Christian Network (broadcaster)
 CTS (Christian Television System)
 CBS (Christian Broadcasting System)
 FEBC Korea (Far East Broadcasting Company)
 PBC (Pyeonghwa/Peace Broadcasting Corporation) ; catholic
 BBS (Buddhist Broadcasting System)
 WBS (원음방송 – Original Sound Broadcasting)

Spain
 Cadena COPE ; Owned by Spanish Catholic Church
 Radio María – Catholic radio

Trinidad and Tobago
 Radio Jaagriti 102.7 FM (Hindu); owned by the Sanatan Dharma Maha Sabha

United Kingdom
Religious broadcasting in the UK was established on 30 July 1922, a Sunday, when the first radio sermon was transmitted by Dr. J. Boon of the Peckham Christian Union, from the Burdette Aerial Works at Blackheath, to the congregation at Christ Church, Peckham, and listeners up to 100 miles distant.

The religious ethos of the British Broadcasting Corporation, and the importance attributed to the place of its religious output is predominantly due to the distinctive and formative role played by the BBC's first Director-General, John Reith. Reith was the son of a Presbyterian minister. Although opposed to narrow dogmatism, he strongly believed that it was a public service duty of the BBC to actively promote religion. The pattern established by Reith in the early days, and the advisory system that he established, continued to exert a strong influence on the corporation's religious output through the war years and beyond, and eventually extend from radio into television.

British broadcasting laws prohibit religious organizations, political parties, local government, and trade unions from running national analog terrestrial stations. Some religious radio stations are available in certain areas on the MW (medium wave) or VHF (FM) wavebands; others transmit using other methods, some of them nationally (such as via digital terrestrial TV broadcasting, satellite, and cable).

Premier Radio is available on MW in the London area and also nationally on DAB. United Christian Broadcasters is available in both the London and Stoke-on-Trent areas, and nationally as well via DAB. TWR-UK is available on Sky, Freeview, Freesat and online. There are several UK-based radio stations that serve a genre group or locality, such as Cross Rhythms based in Stoke-on-Trent, a contemporary music station with a local FM community radio license. Branch FM operates across West Yorkshire and is a volunteer-run community Christian radio station. Like most other local Christian stations, they also use the Internet to gain national coverage. There are other UK-based radio channels which apply for regular temporary licenses, such as Flame FM on the Wirral, Cheshire which applies for two months of local FM broadcasting per year via a Restricted Service Licence (RSL), and Refresh FM, which regularly broadcasts in Manchester for 3 or 4 weeks over the Easter period.

Also, there are religious broadcasters that transmit to the UK from outside on medium wave at night (when MW signals travel much further) by buying airtime on commercial stations such as Manx Radio (from the Isle of Man) and Trans World Radio (from Monte Carlo).

Although there are tight restrictions on religious groups setting up their own radio and TV stations, there is a legal requirement for the BBC and ITV to broadcast a certain amount of religious programming. Some commercial local radio stations carry a limited amount of religious programming, particularly in Northern Ireland and parts of Scotland.

United States
On January 2, 1921, KDKA broadcast the church services from Calvary Episcopal Church, Pittsburgh, PA. The Rev. Lewis B. Whittemore, an associate pastor of the church, conducted the service, thus becoming the first Christian broadcaster. In 1923, Calvary Baptist Church in New York City was the first church to operate its own radio station."Tell It From Calvary" is a radio show that the church still produces weekly; its heard on WMCA AM570. In 1938 the Federal Council of Churches petitioned the National Association of Broadcasters and the Federal Communications Commission formally requesting that all paid religious programs be barred from the air. The major radio networks at this time donated time to the three major divisions of organized religion in the United States: Protestant, Roman Catholic, and Judaism. Protestant programming had been placed under exclusive direction of the Council, an organization which represented about thirty denominations but less than half of American Protestantism. Overtly liberal in its theology, the Federal Council would not sponsor a conservative program such as the Lutheran Hour. Jealous of its privilege, the Council's general secretary was on record as having said in 1929, "in the future, no denomination or individual church will be able to secure any time whatever on the air unless they are willing to pay prohibitively high prices....” This was defeated by Walter A. Maier and others.

The most prominent religion on the radio in the United States is Christianity, particularly the evangelical sect. It has changed since its inception with a growing audience and different regulations. The audience for Christian radio has grown in the past twenty years and has a dispersed audience throughout the U.S.. The Moody Bible Institute was the first religious organization to use satellite radio to reach a larger audience than before. The Moody Bible Institute was also one of the first religious broadcasting networks to receive a non-commercial educational FM license from the FCC allowing them to open other stations. Religious broadcasting in the United States is mainly the province of local or regional networks which produce programming relevant to their community, and is usually heard on stations holding non-commercial educational broadcast licenses. Although religious radio began as locally owned, because of the deregulation in the 1996 Telecommunications act it has become more consolidated with local affiliates under a national radio company. Several national networks do exist, which include:

3ABN Radio
Air1
EWTN Radio
Family Radio
K-LOVE 
LifeTalk Radio
Radio 74 Internationale
Relevant Radio
Salem Radio Network
VCY America

Television
(The distinction between radio and television broadcasters is not rigid; broadcasters in both areas may appear in the Radio or Television section in this article.)

Australia

Australian Christian Channel

Africa

 T.B. Joshua's Emmanuel TV.
 Ezekiel TV is a Christian television network started by Ezekiel Guti of ZAOGA Forward in Faith Ministries International (FIFMI) in 2008, based in South Africa.  Most of the programming is from Zimbabwe, where ZAOGA FIFMI is headquartered. The channel broadcasts on the internet on the FIFMI Website.
Deen TV is an Islamic TV station broadcasting to a wide range of audience interest based in South Africa.

Asia

3ABN
CGTN
 BBS (Buddhist Broadcasting System) 
 CPBC TV (Catholic Peace Broadcasting TV); HQ- Seoul, South Korea
 CPBS TV (Confucianism Peace Broadcasting Corporation TV) 
 CGNTV (Christian Global Network Television)
 Kantas-HSTV (Kantor Warta Swastiyastu-Hindu Spirits Television)
 Kantas-HSTV

Brazil
Rede Vida (Catholic national television network)
TV Aparecida (Catholic national television network)
TV Canção Nova (Catholic national television network)
TV Evangelizar (Catholic national television network)
TV Nazaré (Catholic regional television network, focused to Brazilian Legal Amazon states)
TV Pai Eterno (Catholic national television network)
RIT (owned by International Grace of God Church)
TV Universal (owned by Universal Church of the Kingdom of God)
Rede Mundial (owned by World Church of God's Power)
Rede Boas Novas (owned by Convention of the Assemblies of God in Brazil)
Rede Gospel (owned by Reborn in Christ Church)
Rede Gênesis (owned by Heal Our Earth Evangelical Community)
TV Novo Tempo (owned by Seventh-day Adventist Church)

Canada
Networks

Channels

France
HolyGod TV, Christian station based in France with stated mission "to evangelise people in India, Sri Lanka, Africa, Europe and other countries and plant churches"
HOSFO TV, Christian station in France founded by Pastor Allen IKADI and his wife Josiane Ondeu through their private Christian media company group HOSFO SAS
GOSPLAY DIGITAL TELEVISION a 24/7 gospel music TV Channel.
KTO ; TV Catholique for the Archdiocese of Paris
NLM TV (New Living Ministries), Christian station based in France with presence in other countries

Germany
K-TV; K-TV Katholisches Fernsehen. Catholic broadcaster founded by Father Hans Buschor in 1999 in Gossau, Switzerland. K-TV produces live mass broadcasts and original programming in German and is the first and largest German Catholic satellite and cable broadcast organisation operating in the DACH region. It is supported solely via private donations.

India
 Aastha TV (Hinduism)
 Divya Channel(Hinduism,Sikh)
 Sanskar TV(Hinduism,Sikh)
 ANGEL TV (Christianity)
 GOD TV ASIA (Christianity)
 JCILM TV (Christianity)
 HopeTV (Christianity)
 Islamiya (Islam)
 MH Sarrdha (Hinduism, Sikh, Jain)
 Omkar (Buddhism,Hinduism)
 PaigaamTV (Islam)
 RamrajTV  (Hinduism)
 Sadana TV (Hinduism)
 Sanskar (Jainism)
 Sanskar (Sanatan Dharam, Hinduism)
 Shree Sankara (Hinduism)
 Sikha TV (Sikhism, Hinduism)
 Vadic Brobcact (Hinduism, Sikhism)

Indonesia
 MQTV
 TV MUI

Italy
Padre Pio TV
Telepace; HQ Cerna
TV2000; Owned by Italian Episcopal Conference. HQ Rome.

Middle East
In the Middle East, Christian satellite broadcaster SAT-7 operates five channels, SAT-7 ARABIC, SAT-7 PARS (Farsi), SAT-7 KIDS (Arabic), SAT-7 PLUS (Arabic) and SAT-7 TÜRK (Turkish), which broadcast in the prominent languages of the region with more than 80% of programs made by and for people of the region. SAT-7's satellite footprints reach 22 countries in the Middle East and North Africa, as well as 50 countries in Europe, with "free to air" programming. SAT7, founded in 1995, is the first and largest Christian satellite broadcast organization operating in the region. It is supported by Christian churches from a variety of denominations in the Middle East and North Africa, as well as supporters from Europe, Canada , United States , and Asia.

Norway
 Visjon Norge, a Norwegian Christian television channel that broadcasts over Scandinavia.
 Kanal 10 Norge, a Norwegian Christian television channel and branch of the Swedish Kanal 10.

The Philippines

TV Maria (owned by the Philippine Roman Catholic Church)
Light TV 33 (owned by Jesus Is Lord Worldwide)
Iglesia ni Cristo TV (INC TV) (owned by the indigenous sect Iglesia ni Cristo)
Truth Channel (owned by another indigenous sect Members Church of God International)
Sonshine Media Network International (owned by another than indigenous sect Kingdom of Jesus Christ and Kingdom Light Congregation)

Poland
 TV Trwam – A Christian-national Polish educational, guide and religious TV station based in Toruń, belonging to the Lux Veritatis Foundation registered in Warsaw.

Pakistan
A function of the state-owned Pakistan Broadcasting Corporation is by law "to broadcast such programmes as may promote Islamic ideology, national unity and principles of democracy, freedom equality, tolerance and social justice as enunciated by Islam..." (s. 10(1)(b)).
 Catholic TV (Pakistan)

Trinidad and Tobago
TV Jaagriti (Hindu); owned by the Sanatan Dharma Maha Sabha
Sankhya Television (Hindu)
Bhakti TV (Hindu)
ieTV (Hindu)
The Islamic Network (T.I.N.) (Muslim)
Islamic Broadcast Network (Muslim)
Trinity TV (Roman Catholic)

Turkey
Islamic broadcasters include:
 TGRT, Turkey's first nationwide "Islamic" television channel, est. 1993
 STV, affiliated with the Gülen movement, est. 1994
 Kanal 7
 Mesaj TV
 Nisa TV
 Berat TV

United Kingdom
In the UK, the first religious channel was Muslim TV Ahmadiyya, which launched in 1992. However, religious television is dominated by the main non-commercial terrestrial public service broadcaster, the BBC, obliged by its licence to broadcast 110 hours per year. Long-running programmes such as Songs of Praise continue to draw loyal audiences, although declining interest in devotional-style religious programmes — and sometimes erratic scheduling decisions — have taken their toll. Up until the turn of the century, the ITV network and Channel 4 also produced religious programme content, and for many years, Sunday evenings were dominated by 'the God slot' — a 70-minute period of religious programmes broadcast simultaneously on BBC1 and ITV. Attempts to extend the range of formats and experiment in more populist styles reached its zenith in the late 1960s with the light entertainment show, Stars on Sunday (Yorkshire Television, 1969–1979) on ITV, reaching audiences of 15 million.  The show was conceived and presented by Yorkshire Television's Head of Children's Programmes, Jess Yates and ran for a decade. Serious documentary-style religious content emerged in the 1970s, with the BBC's Everyman, and ITV's Credo programme series'. Religious broadcasting declined in the later 1970s and 1980s. The birth of the fourth public service channel in 1982, with a remit to cater for minority interests, raised expectations followed by disappointment among many who believed that Channel 4 would provide new opportunities for religious broadcasting. Channel 4's first major religious programme commission caused a furore: Jesus: The Evidence (London Weekend Television for Channel 4), broadcast over the Easter period in 1984, proved to be a pivotal moment in the disintegrating relationship between the broadcasting institutions and the churches.

In 2010, the commercial public service television broadcasters de-prioritised their religious output due to commercial pressures. The 2009 Ofcom report found that religious broadcasting on public service channels was watched on average for 2.3 hours per year per viewer on the main PSB channels in 2011, 2.7 hours in 2008, reducing steadily from 3.2 in 2006 and 3.6 in 2001. In 2006, 5% of viewers found religious broadcasting to be of personal importance.

In 2017, the BBC announced that it was closing its dedicated Religious and Ethics Department and outsourcing its religious expertise and production work: a move described as 'dangerous' by at least one national newspaper, suggesting that the decision was based on a mistaken presumption that religion was 'a preoccupation of people who are old, strange or both, something of no interest to those happy enough to be neither' The BBC's decision, and the quantitative decline in religious broadcasting over several decades (as well as a growing sense that there was an absence of informed portrayals of religion in content more generally), has been implicated in what has been described as a rise in "religious illiteracy". Partly in response to these concerns, there was a major internal review at the BBC during 2017 'to reassess our role and strategy in this area, and reconsider how best to deliver our public service mission'. According to the BBC's internal report in December of that year:In practice, that means the BBC will: Raise our game across all output – Increase specialist expertise with a new Religious Affairs Team and Religion Editor in News (p19); Create networks of specialists (p27); Develop stakeholder relations (p27); Reach as many people as possible – Landmark series and programmes (p21); Cross-genre commissions (p16), A 'Year of Beliefs' in 2019 (p23); Content and social media aimed at a next generation audience (p23); Portray the diversity of beliefs and society – Diversify our range of contributors (p14); Increase coverage of religious events (p15); Enhance portrayal in mainstream programming (p17); Help people understand their values and decisions – Innovative content that works across genres (p17); Innovative online services that include archive content that is still relevant (p25)The BBC has yet to unveil details of plans for its 2019 'Year of Beliefs'.

Dedicated religious channels are relatively new, and transmit via direct-to-home satellite, some, are streamed live via the Internet or, like TBN, broadcast 24 hours on terrestrial Freeview. Dedicated religious channels available include:

Daystar, US network, broadcast 24 hours on terrestrial digital freeview.
TBN, broadcast 24 hours on terrestrial freeview and Sky. 
GOD TV, based in Sunderland (UK), is the longest established of the currently running TV channels on Sky in the UK and the only one that is also on the major cable TV systems in the UK.
God's Learning Channel (GLC) broadcasts the same lineup simultaneously to the US and Europe via the Eutelsat W-2 Satellite for Direct-to-Home broadcast.
Inspiration, US Network. Programming from around the world. Preaching. Missionary bias.
Islam Channel. Broadcasts across Europe, the Middle East and North Africa and streamed on the Internet, and will broadcast in North America. Ruled to have breached the UK broadcasting code by airing discussions containing contentious views on violence against women and marital rape in 2008 and 2009.
Revelation TV, in London, produce a lot of live programmes from their studios.
 Let The Bible Speak
http://www.ltbs.tv

In the UK, Vision TV UK is available to viewers with Religious channels: Revelation TV, Firstlight, Good News TV, Dunamis TV, and Daystar TV.  Also available are 3ABN television networks: 3ABN, 3ABN Latino, 3ABN Proclaim!, 3ABN Dare to Dream, 3ABN Français, 3ABN Russia, 3ABN Kids, and 3ABN Praise Him Music.
 VisionTV UK
http://www.visiontv.co.uk

See also List of Islamic television and radio stations in the United Kingdom

United States
Religious television stations in the United States experienced growth in the 1990s, the number of faith-based T.V. stations alone has tripled. The United States government does not regulate these networks to the same extent as it does commercial outlets, as the Free Exercise Clause lim

its how much the government can interfere in evangelism. Religious television is widely used by evangelical Christian groups, but other religions using television broadcasting is also growing. The audience for religious television is still mainly white, middle-class, evangelicals but, that is also changing as there is an increase in young Catholic viewers and Spanish-language religious television. There has also been a growth in the number and power of television preachers in the United States, particularly evangelical preachers, also known as televangelists.

In the United States, Christian organizations are by far the most widespread compared with other religions, with upwards of 1,600 television and radio stations across the country (not necessarily counting broadcast translators, though because many outlets have low power and repeat national telecasts, the difference is often hard to define).

Christian television outlets in the U.S. usually broadcast in the UHF band. While there are many religious content providers for religious and faith-based television, there are few nationally recognized non-commercial television networks—funded by soliciting donations—such as Daystar Television Network (operated by Marcus Lamb and Joni Lamb) and Trinity Broadcasting Network (TBN) (operated by Paul Crouch and Jan Crouch).  Unlike the larger religious network providers available to the mass public, many smaller religious organizations have a presence on cable television systems, either with their own channels (such as the 3ABN service) or by transmissions on public-access television common for local congregations) or leased access channels. Religious programs are sometimes also transmitted on Sunday mornings by general commercial broadcasters not dedicated to religious programming.

Religious broadcasters in the U.S. include:
Catholic Media Network (Catholicism)
Amazing Facts Television (AFTV)
BYUtv
Calvary Chapel
Catholic Faith Network (formerly Telecare)
CatholicTV
Christian Broadcasting Network (CBN, part-time network established by Pat Robertson)
Christian Television Network (CTN)
Daystar
Eternal Word Television Network (EWTN); founded by Mother Angelica
Familyland Television Network
GOD TV
God's Learning Channel (GLC)
GEB America
Islamic Broadcasting Network
Hope Channel
It Is Written TV
Jewish Life Television
LeSEA Broadcasting
Living Faith Television (LFTv)
Loma Linda Broadcasting Network (LLBN)
 Peace TV In English, Urdu & Bangla languages
 Scientology Network
 Sonlife Broadcasting Network (SBN); outlet of Jimmy Swaggart
Three An
gels Broa
dcasting Network (3ABN)
RadiantTV
Tri-State Christian Television
INSP (now predominantly secular)
Trinity Broadcasting Network (TBN)
World Heritage Channel (WHC)
Victory Television Network (VTN)

Industry organizations

United Kingdom
The UK equivalent of the NRB is the Christian Broadcasting Council, but affiliation is much less common. Additionally in the UK is the Church and Media Network, formed in 2009 as a successor to the Churches' Media Council, which states that it seeks to be a bridge between the media and the Christian community.

United States
Christian broadcasters (but not other religions) in the U.S. are organized through the National Religious Broadcasters (NRB) organization.

Funding
Financially, US channels tend to fare a lot better than UK based ones. The American concept of asking viewers to donate money to a channel to keep it going on air is considered more culturally acceptable than in the UK; as a result more money is raised this way. However this has become more contentious as television preachers have been accused of corruption and soliciting donations for their own personal use. There used to be no advertising revenue model – the traditional method of running commercial TV in the UK – that worked for religious TV channels. The UK government's Broadcasting Act 1990 allowed ownership of broadcasting licences by religious organisations and their officers and those who controlled them in some circumstances; this had previously not been allowed.

Religious channels aimed at a UK audience could get around this previous restriction by basing themselves offshore, often in a European country that permits asking viewers for money on air. Stations may appear to be based in the UK, but actually broadcast from another country. However Ofcom since lifted the restriction, and channels with UK licences can now ask for funds on air.

The other primary method for raising funds to run religious channels is to accept paid advertising. Traveling preachers and large churches and ministries often set up a TV department filming what they do; they then buy slots on TV channels to show their programmes. Often the same programme from an organization is shown on several channels at different times as they buy slots. The vast majority of organizations which do this are US-based. In the UK this tends to make Christian TV channels appear to be US-based, as most material originates there. Some UK TV channels have invested in making programmes to complement advertising, most notably GOD TV and Revelation TV.

See also 
 Catholic Television
 List of religious radio stations
 List of religious topics

References

External links

Mariah Blake, Columbia Journalism Review, 5 May 2005, "Air Jesus"